A constitutional referendum was held in Turkey on 25 September 1988. The proposed changes to the constitution would have led to the 1989 local elections being held a year early. However, they were voted down, with 65% of voters against. Turnout was 88.8%.

Results

References

External links
Results
About referendum

1988
1988 referendums
1988 in Turkey